Philippus Jacobus van Zyl (born 23 April 1988 in Rustenburg, South Africa) is a South African rugby union player, currently playing with Portuguese Campeonato Português de Rugby side Agronomia. His is a utility forward that can play as a lock, a flanker or a number eight.

Career

Youth and Varsity rugby

Van Zyl was part of the  squad in 2007 and the  squad in 2009.

Boland Cavaliers

At the start of 2011, Van Zyl joined Wellington-based side . Van Zyl was on the field for less than ten minutes when he scored his first senior try.

He soon established himself as a regular starter for Boland in both the Vodacom Cup and Currie Cup competitions and reached his half-century of appearances during the 2013 Currie Cup First Division season.

Chalon

At the conclusion of the 2014 Currie Cup First Division, Van Zyl moved to France to join Fédérale 1 side Chalon.

References

South African rugby union players
Living people
1988 births
Rugby union locks
Rugby union flankers
Rugby union number eights
People from Rustenburg
Boland Cavaliers players
Rugby union players from North West (South African province)